YDA may refer to:

 IATA code for Dawson City Airport in the Yukon.
 Yale Debate Association
 Young Democrats of America.
 Youth Development Administration, a government agency in Taiwan.
 Yale Dramatic Association ("Dramat") of Yale University.
 A non-playable character from Final Fantasy XIV: A Realm Reborn video game.